The Walking Company, Inc. (sometimes referred to as TWC), is a United States-based comfort footwear company and subsidiary of The Walking Company Holdings, Inc., that was founded in 1991 in Chatsworth, California.

History 
Co-founders Steve Adler and Jim Argyropoulos created the plan for The Walking Company (formerly The Walking Store) after Argyropoulos’ return from a vacation in Europe, where he was inspired by European footwear designs. In July 1991, they opened and self-financed the first store in Pasadena, California. Shortly after the store's opening, it faced some setbacks and endured through several earthquakes and a fire. Nonetheless, Adler and Argyropoulos opened four more stores within a year of opening their first location.

Adler attributed the company's initial success to its narrow focus on a specific walking shoe category sold at a reasonable price targeting 56 million Americans in the walking market. "You're not going to be able to buy a great $50 technical walking shoe," Adler said in 1992. "We're trying to bring the price points down to $100."

In 2004, TWC was acquired by Big Dogs Holdings, Inc., based in Santa Barbara, California, and Andrew Feshbach became the CEO of the company. At the time of acquisition, The Walking Company operated 72 stores in 28 states.

In 2009, TWC filed for bankruptcy. The company originally planned to close 90 of 210 stores, but after receiving rent concessions from landlords and key vendors, was able to emerge from bankruptcy in April 2010 with 207 stores still in place. 

The company reorganized its brand in 2010, and The Walking Company became a subsidiary of The Walking Company Holdings, Inc., along with Big Dogs, an activewear and accessories brand. By 2015, The Walking Company had expanded to 212 mostly mall-based retail stores and a distribution center in Lincolnton, North Carolina.

In March 2018, the company filed for bankruptcy again. On June 29 of that year, the company announced it was emerging from bankruptcy after receiving over $10 million in new equity, and was closing 23 of the 208 stores that were open at the time of the filing.

Other brands 
The Walking Company is home to Raffini Umberto and Tara M. brands. In 2009, the company developed ABEO, a selection of comfort footwear made with built-in or removable orthotics. By 2010, the ABEO brand expanded to casual styles and athletics and had generated $3 million in revenue with plans to reach $80 million in revenue in the following 4 years.

Footnotes

External links 
 Official Website

American companies established in 1991
Retail companies established in 1991
Footwear retailers of the United States
1991 establishments in California
Companies that filed for Chapter 11 bankruptcy in 2009
Companies that filed for Chapter 11 bankruptcy in 2018